Edward Seymour, 9th Duke of Somerset, etc. (2 January 1717 – 2 January 1792) was the eldest son of Edward Seymour, 8th Duke of Somerset and his wife, the former Mary Webb. He was also a baronet.

He was baptized on 27 January 1717 at Easton in Wiltshire. He succeeded his father as Duke of Somerset on 12 December 1757. He was named a Privy Councillor by George II and in 1783 was awarded an annual pension, which along with his financial management and reclusiveness contributed to the growth of his fortune.

He died on his 75th birthday, unmarried and childless, and was interred on 11 January 1792 at Maiden Bradley, near Warminster, Wiltshire. His titles passed to his brother Webb Seymour.

Ancestry

References

1717 births
1792 deaths
509
Edward Seymour, 09th Duke of Somerset